In mathematics, in the area of algebra studying the character theory of finite groups, an M-group or monomial group is a finite group whose complex irreducible characters are all monomial, that is, induced from characters of degree 1 .

In this section only finite groups are considered. Every supersolvable group  and every solvable A-group  is a monomial group.

The symmetric group  is an example of a monomial group that is neither supersolvable nor an A-group. The special linear group  is the smallest finite group that is not monomial: since the abelianization of this group has order three, its irreducible characters of degree two are not monomial.

References

Finite groups
Properties of groups